Cawood is a census-designated place (CDP) and coal town in Harlan County, Kentucky, United States. The population was 731 at the 2010 census.

A post office in Cawood was established in 1890 by Wilson S. Hensley. He said one of his ancestors was Berry Cawood, a hero of the Revolutionary War.

Geography
Cawood is in south-central Harlan County in the valley of Crummies Creek, where it joins Martins Fork of the Cumberland River. U.S. Route 421 now borders the southern edge of the community, leading northwest down the Martins Fork valley  to Harlan, the county seat, and southeast across the Tennessee Valley Divide  to Pennington Gap, Virginia.

Demographics

As of the 2010 census there were 731 people, 292 households, and 210 families residing in the CDP. The population density was 39 people per square mile (61.1/km).

References

Census-designated places in Harlan County, Kentucky
Census-designated places in Kentucky
Coal towns in Kentucky